Lodderena pachynepion is a species of sea snail, a marine gastropod mollusk in the family Skeneidae.

References

External links
 To World Register of Marine Species

pachynepion
Gastropods described in 1945